The 1939 All-Ireland Minor Football Championship was the 11th staging of the All-Ireland Minor Football Championship, the Gaelic Athletic Association's premier inter-county Gaelic football tournament for boys under the age of 18.

Cavan entered the championship as defending champions, however, they were defeated by Monaghan in a replay of the Ulster final.

On 24 September 1939, Roscommon won the championship following a 1-9 to 1-7 defeat of Monaghan in the All-Ireland final. This was their first All-Ireland title.

Results

Connacht Minor Football Championship

Munster Minor Football Championship

Ulster Minor Football Championship

Leinster Minor Football Championship

All-Ireland Minor Football Championship

Semi-finals

Final

Championship statistics

Miscellaneous

 In the provincial championships there are a number of firsts as Cork, Roscommon and Westmeath win the respective Munster, Connacht and Leinster titles for the first time.

References

1939
All-Ireland Minor Football Championship